The Oregon Collegiate Conference (also the Oregon Intercollegiate Conference) was an intercollegiate athletic conference that existed from 1950 to 1970. The conference's members were located in the state of Oregon.

Members
The following is an incomplete list of the membership of the Oregon Collegiate Conference.

Football champions

1950 – 
1951 – 
1952 – 
1953 – 
1954 –  and 
1956 – 
1957 – 
1958 – 
1959 – 

1960 – 
1961 – 
1962 – 
1963 – 
1964 –  and 
1965 – 
1966 – 
1967 –  and 
1968 – 
1969 –

See also
List of defunct college football conferences
Evergreen Conference
Columbia Football League
Columbia Football Association

References

 
1950 establishments in Oregon
1970 disestablishments in Oregon